Vercassivellaunus (?- 46 BC) was a Gaulish commander of the Arverni who led a relief force to assist Vercingetorix, who was besieged and low on supplies, in the Battle of Alesia.  Caesar refers to him as a cousin of Vercingetorix. He encamped with his generals to the west of the battle. According to Caesar, their names were Commius, Viridomarus and Eporedorix. Sedullos, chief of the Lemovices, joined Vercassivellaunus with 10,000 of his own men and was killed at the battle. According to Caesar's "Commentarii de Bello Gallico", Vercassivellaunus was taken prisoner. It is speculated that he was subsequently strangled to death with the other Gaulish prisoners of war as part of the Triumph in which Caesar celebrated his victory over the Gauls.

References

Celts
Gaulish rulers
Barbarian people of the Gallic Wars
1st-century BC rulers in Europe